Kenneth L. Krysko is an American herpetologist. He was educated at Florida State University during his undergrad years and then at the University of Florida, where he earned his Ph.D. in Wildlife Ecology and Conservation. He is known for his expert knowledge on geckos and other invasive species in Florida. He is currently the collection manager of Herpetology at the Florida Museum of Natural History.

Krysko teaches herpetology at the University of Florida. He is an avid fossil hunter. He is currently known best for his research in the field of reptile genetics, where he has discovered genetic variations in the eastern indigo snake. He is well respected for his research in kingsnake genetics, and he "invented" a technique for capturing lizards by using a fishing line with a tiny hook baited with crickets. He was recently consulted for an episode of the show MonsterQuest, dealing with the rumor about alligators living in the sewers of New York City.

External links
 Kenneth Krysko's Current Research

References 

Living people
American herpetologists
Collection managers
University of Florida College of Agricultural and Life Sciences alumni
Year of birth missing (living people)